Kent Bowers (died 19 June 1985) was a Belizean man convicted of murder and executed by Belize.  He is the most recent person to have been executed in Belize.

On 4 July 1984, Bowers entered a restaurant in Belize City where Francis Codd and Dora Codd were hosting a private party for their twenty-fifth wedding anniversary. According to testimony heard when the case later went to trial, Bowers was asked to leave and their son, Robert Codd, escorted him to the door. A struggle ensued outside between Bowers and Codd, and Bowers stabbed Codd several times. Codd died within minutes of the incident.

Bowers was arrested and charged with murder. He was convicted on 23 October 1984 and given the mandatory sentence of death by hanging. Bowers appealed his conviction to the Court of Appeal of Belize, but his arguments were rejected. Bowers's petition for clemency was rejected by the Governor General (section 52.1Belize Constitution) Dr Dame Minita Gordon .

Bowers was hanged on 19 June 1985 in Her Majesty's prison on Goal Lane Belize City . No one has been executed by Belize since Bowers, but capital punishment remains as a possible legal punishment in Belize.

See also
Glenford Baptist, Belize's most recent death row prisoner
Nora Parham, only Belizean woman to be executed

References

Further reading
Amnesty International (1989). When the State Kills: The Death Penalty v. Human Rights (New York: Amnesty International) p. 108

External links
Bowers v. The Queen, Court of Appeal of Belize, 1984, belizelaw.org, accessed 2008-08-14

1985 deaths
20th-century executions by Belize
People executed by Belize by hanging
Executed Belizean people
People executed for murder
Belizean people convicted of murder
People convicted of murder by Belize
Year of birth missing
1984 murders in North America